The 32nd Cuban National Series saw a slight contraction of the league. The successful Vegueros team, from Pinar del Río Province combined with its pinareño rival, Forestales, into a new team called Pinar del Río. Further, Henequeneros and Citricultores, both of which had been successful in earlier series, merged to become Matanzas.

For the first time the teams were split into 4 groups rather than 2.

The newly formed Pinar del Río team lost a close series to Villa Clara, as the Naranjas took their second National Series title.

Standings

Group A

Group B

Group C

Group D

Playoffs

References

 (Note - text is printed in a white font on a white background, depending on browser used.)

Cuban National Series seasons
Base
Base
Cuba